February 2015 Kramatorsk rocket attack — a shelling of Kramatorsk by Russian forces or pro-Russian separatists during the War in Donbas. Kramatorsk was controlled by Ukrainian government forces at the time of the attack. As a result of shelling, 17 people have died and about 60 were injured.

According to Oleksandr Kikhtenko, 32 rockets were launched, 18 of them landed in civilian areas, while 14 of them landed near Kramatorsk military airfield, where ATO headquarters were located.

Background 
On 10 February at 11:51 SMM OSCE heard an explosion near Kramatorsk military airfield, where ATO headquarters were located. OSCE monitors were able to observe a white smoke trail in the direction of the explosion. It was later reported, that Russian UAV Orlan-10 was shot down near the airfield using Buk missile system before an attack on Kramatorsk started.

Attack 
Shelling started at 12:30 and 32 rockets were launched, 18 of them landed in civilian areas, while 14 of them landed near Kramatorsk military airfield.

Memorial 
A memorial honouring victims of shellings was opened in Kramatorsk three years after the attack. It was dedicated to the victims of shelling in Kramatorsk, as well as in Mariupol and Volnovakha. The memorial looks like a glass cube with a BM-30 Smerch rocket in it. "How many more people must die?" with a list of names of dead civilians is written on the cube.

See also 
 January 2015 Mariupol rocket attack
 Murder of Pentecostals in Sloviansk
 Donetsk "Donetskhirmash" bus station attack 
 Volnovakha bus attack 
 Malaysia Airlines Flight 17

References 

Ukrainian war casualties
Attacks in Ukraine in 2015
Donetsk People's Republic
February 2015 events in Ukraine
Russian war crimes in Ukraine
21st-century mass murder in Ukraine
2015 murders in Ukraine